Wales Stream is a meltwater stream that drains from Wales Glacier to Explorers Cove in New Harbour, Victoria Land. The name was used by New Zealand geologist Burton Murrell in 1973, but he attributes it to an earlier use by C.G. Vucetich and H.W. Wellman.

Rivers of Victoria Land
McMurdo Dry Valleys